Dynon is a surname. Notable people with the surname include: 

Denis Dynon (1822-1863), Irish recipient of the Victoria Cross
Kevin Dynon (1925-2017), Australian footballer
Moira Lenore Dynon (1920-1976), Australian chemist and community activist

See also
Dynon Avionics, American aircraft avionics manufacturer